
Gmina Nowogard is an urban-rural gmina (administrative district) in Goleniów County, West Pomeranian Voivodeship, in north-western Poland.

Villages
Apart from the town of Nowogard, Gmina Nowogard contains the villages and settlements of: 
 
 Bieńczyce
 Bieniczki
 Błotno
 Błotny Młyn
 Bochlin
 Boguszyce
 Bromierz
 Brzozowo
 Czermnica
 Dąbrowa Nowogardzka
 Długołęka
 Dobroszyn
 Drzysław
 Gardna
 Glicko
 Grabin
 Jarchlino
 Karsk
 Konarzewo
 Kościuszki
 Krasnołęka
 Kulice
 Łęgno
 Lestkowo
 Maszkowo
 Miękkie
 Miętno
 Miodne
 Nowe Wyszomierki
 Ogary
 Ogorzele
 Olchowo
 Olszyca
 Orzechowo
 Orzesze
 Osowo
 Ostrzyca
 Otręby
 Płotkowo
 Ptaszkowo
 Radłowo
 Radziszewo
 Sąpole
 Sąpolnica
 Sieciechowo
 Sikorki
 Słajsino
 Stare Wyszomierki
 Starogoszcz
 Struga
 Strzelewo
 Suchy Las
 Świerczewo
 Szczytniki
 Trzechel
 Warnkowo
 Wierzbięcin
 Wierzchęcino
 Wierzchy
 Wojcieszyn
 Wołowiec
 Wyszomierz
 Żabówko
 Żabowo
 Zagórz
 Zakłodzie
 Zatocze
 Zbyszewice

Neighbouring gminas
Gmina Nowogard is bordered by the gminas of Dobra, Golczewo, Maszewo, Osina, Płoty, Przybiernów, Radowo Małe and Resko.

References
Polish official population figures 2006

Nowogard
Goleniów County